Frank Delmar (Tub) Hansen (December 27, 1913 – December 29, 1991) was an American politician in the state of Washington. He served in the Washington House of Representatives from 1973 to 1979 for district 13, and in the Senate from 1979 to his death in 1991.

References

1913 births
1991 deaths
Democratic Party members of the Washington House of Representatives
People from Okanogan County, Washington
20th-century American politicians
Democratic Party Washington (state) state senators